Amsalem is a surname. Notable people with the surname include:
 Bernard Amsalem (born 1951), French organizer of athletics
 David Amsalem (born 1971), Israeli footballer
 Dudu Amsalem (born 1960), Israeli politician
 Haim Amsalem (born 1959), Israeli politician
 Reymond Amsalem (born 1978), Israeli actress
 Shimon Amsalem (born 1966), Israeli basketball player
 Nissim Eliad (born Nissim Amsalem 1919), Israeli politician and lawyer

Maghrebi Jewish surnames
Surnames of Moroccan origin